The 12th Annual Latin Grammy Awards was held on Thursday, November 10, 2011, at the Mandalay Bay Events Center in Las Vegas and was hosted by Lucero and Cristián de la Fuente. The eligibility period for recordings to be nominated is July 1, 2010 to June 30, 2011. The show will be aired on Univision.

Puerto Rican band Calle 13 were the big winners of the night with nine awards (breaking the previous record of five wins in a single ceremony) including Album of the Year for Entren Los Que Quieran; and Record of the Year and Song of the Year for "Latinoamérica". The Best New Artist award went to Sie7e. Shakira was honored as the Person of the Year the night before the telecast and she also won the award for Best Female Pop Vocal Album for Sale El Sol.

Awards
Winners are in bold text.

General
Record of the Year

Calle 13 featuring Totó la Momposina, Susana Baca and Maria Rita – "Latinoamérica"

Franco De Vita and Alejandra Guzmán – "Tan Sólo Tú"
Luis Fonsi – "Gritar"
Los Tigres del Norte featuring Paulina Rubio – "Golpes en el Corazón"
Ricky Martin featuring Natalia Jiménez – "Lo Mejor de Mi Vida Eres Tú"

Album of the Year

Calle 13 – Entren Los Que Quieran

Alex, Jorge y Lena – Alex, Jorge y Lena
Franco De Vita – En Primera Fila
Enrique Iglesias – Euphoria
Shakira – Sale el Sol

Song of the Year

Rafa Arcaute and Calle 13 – "Latinoamérica" (Calle 13 featuring Totó la Momposina, Susana Baca and Maria Rita)

Marco Antonio Solís – "A Dónde Vamos a Parar"
Jorge Drexler – "Que El Soneto Nos Tome Por Sorpresa"
Pablo Alborán – "Solamente Tú"
Eric Bazilian, Claudia Brant, Andreas Carlsson, Desmond Child and Ricky Martin – "Lo Mejor de Mi Vida Eres Tú" (Ricky Martin featuring Natalia Jiménez)

Best New Artist

Sie7e

Pablo Alborán
Max Capote
Paula Fernandes
Il Volo

Pop
Best Female Pop Vocal Album

Shakira – Sale el Sol

Claudia Brant – Manuscrito
Myriam Hernández – Seducción
Malú – Guerra Fría
Merche – Acordes de Mi Diario

Best Male Pop Vocal Album

Franco De Vita – En Primera Fila

Pablo Alborán – Pablo Alborán
Reyli – Bien Acompañado
Cristian Castro – Viva el príncipe
Marco Antonio Solís – En Total Plenitud

Best Pop Album by a Duo/Group with Vocals

Alex, Jorge y Lena – Alex, Jorge y Lena

Belanova – Sueño Electro I
Il Volo – Edición En Español
Río Roma – Al Fin Te Encontré
Siam – Siam

Urban
Best Urban Music Album

Calle 13 – Entren Los Que Quieran

Don Omar – Don Omar Presents: Meet the Orphans
Pitbull – Armando
Ivy Queen – Drama Queen
Wisin & Yandel – Los Vaqueros: El Regreso

Best Urban Song

Rafa Arcaute and Calle 13 – "Baile de los Pobres" (Calle 13)

Renato Carosone, Mathew Handley, Duncan Maclennas, Nicola Salerno, Andrew Stanley and Pitbull – "Bon, Bon" (Pitbull)
Don Omar and Lucenzo – "Danza Kuduro"
Wisin & Yandel – "Estoy Enamorado"
Daddy Yankee and Prince Royce – "Ven Conmigo"

Rock
Best Rock Album

Maná – Drama y Luz

Don Tetto – Mienteme – Prometeme
Saúl Hernández – Remando
Jarabe de Palo – ¿Y Ahora Qué Hacemos?
La Vida Bohème – Nuestra
No Te Va Gustar – Por Lo Menos Hoy

Best Rock Song

León Larregui and Zoé – "Labios Rotos" (Zoé)

Marcelo Corvalan, Hernan Terry Langer & Andres Vilanova – "Ácido" (Carajo)
Emiliano Brancciari – "Chau" (No Te Va Gustar)
Gustávo Napoli – "Poder" (La Renga)
La Vida Bohème – "Radio Capital"

Alternative
Best Alternative Music Album

Zoé – MTV Unplugged/Música de Fondo

Doctor Krápula – Corazón Bombea/Vivo
Fidel Nadal – Forever Together
Carla Morrison – Mientras Tu Dormias
Mr. Pauer – Soundtrack

Best Alternative Song

Rafa Arcaute and Calle 13 – "Calma Pueblo" (Calle 13 featuring Omar-Rodríguez-López)

San Pascualito Reyes – "Salgamos de Aquí"
Doctor Krápula – "Somos" 
DJ Blass and Fidel Nadal – "Te Robaste Mi Corazón" (Fidel Nadal)
Sie7e – "Tengo Tu Love"

Tropical
Best Salsa Album

Rubén Blades and Seis Del Solar – Todos Vuelven Live

José Alberto "El Canario" – Original
Edwin Bonilla – Homenaje A Los Rumberos
Spanish Harlem Orchestra – Viva La Tradición
Various Artists – Salsa: Un Homenaje A El Gran Combo

Best Cumbia/Vallenato Album

Juan Carlos Coronel — Tesoros

Silvestre Dangond & Juancho De La Espriella – Cantinero
El Binomio de Oro – Corazón de Miel
Peter Manjarrés & Sergio Luis Rodríguez – Tu Número Uno
Felipe Peláez – De Otras Manera
Iván Villazón and Ivan Zulueta – Dando Lidia

Best Contemporary Tropical Album

Tito El Bambino – El Patrón: Invencible

Héctor Acosta – Obligame
Monchy & Nathalia – Monchy & Nathalia
Daniel Santacruz – Bachata Stereo
Paula Zuleta – Mezcla Soy

Best Traditional Tropical Album

Cachao López – The Last Mambo

Albita – Toda Una Vida (Cuban Masterworks)
Adalberto Álvarez – El Son de Altura
Esencia – Con La Fuerza de un Tren
Septeto Santiaguero – Oye Mi Son Santiaguero

Best Tropical Song

Calle 13 – "Vamo' A Portarnos Mal"

Juan Magan – "Bailando Por Ahí"
Alex Bandana, Gloria Estrada & La Marisoul – "La Negra" (La Santa Cecilia)
Rafi Monclova and Gilberto Santa Rosa – "Me Cambiaron Las Preguntas" (Gilberto Santa Rosa)
Yoel Henríquez – "Me Duele la Cabeza"

Singer-Songwriter
Best Singer-Songwriter Album

Amaury Gutiérrez – Sesiones IntimasGian Marco – Días Nuevos

Ricardo Arjona – Poquita Ropa
Carlinhos Brown – Diminuto
Alberto Cortez – Tener En Cuenta

Regional Mexican
Best Ranchero Album

Vicente Fernández – El Hombre Que Mas Te Amó

Pepe Aguilar – Bicentenario 1810 / 1910 / 2010
Lucía Méndez – Canta Un Homenaje A Juan Gabriel
Paquita la del Barrio – Eres Un Farsante
Joan Sebastián – Huevos Rancheros

Best Banda Album

La Arrolladora Banda El Limón – Todo Depende De Tí

Banda Los Recoditos – A Toda Madre
Banda Machos – 20 Años de Éxitos en Vivo
El Guero Y Su Banda Centenario – Estaré Mejor
Espinoza Paz – Del Rancho Para El Mundo
Jenni Rivera – La Gran Señora en Vivo

Best Tejano Album

Little Joe & La Familia – Recuerdos

Chente Barrera – El Número Siete
Joe Posada – In The Pocket
Sunny Sauceda y Todo Eso – Camaleón
Tortilla Factory – CookinBest Norteño AlbumLos Tigres del Norte – MTV Unplugged: Los Tigres del Norte and FriendsIntocable – Intocable 2000
Los Huracanes del Norte – Soy Mexicano
Los Tucanes de Tijuana – Árbol
Pesado – Desde La Cantina, Volumen IIBest Regional SongMarco Antonio Solís – "Tú Me Vuelves Loco"Marco Antonio Solís – "A Dónde Vamos a Parar"
Mario Quintero Lara – "El Jefe de la Sierra" (Los Tucanes de Tijuana)
Joan Sebastián – "El Padrino"
Joan Sebastián – "Huevos Rancheros"

InstrumentalBest Instrumental AlbumChick Corea, Stanley Clarke and Lenny White – ForeverAl Di Meloa – Pursuit of Radical Rhapsody
Escalandrum – Piazzolla Plays Piazzolla
Luis Salinas – Sin Tiempo
Omar Sosa – Calma

TraditionalBest Folk AlbumMercedes Sosa – Deja La Vida Volar – En GiraEva Ayllón & Perú Negro – 40 Años de Clasicos Afro Peruanos
Jorge Pardo – Música Tradicional Peruana Homenaje A Arturo Zambo Cavero Y Oscar Aviles
Soledad Pastorutti – Vivo En Arequito
Santoral – Más Que EnamoraoBest Tango AlbumDiego El Cigala – Cigala & TangoLeopoldo Federico and El Arranque – Raras Partituras 6
Orquesta del Tango de la Ciudad de Buenos Aires and Susana Rinaldi – En Vivo – Homenaje A Cátulo Castillo & Anibal Troilo
Orquesta del Tango de la Ciudad de Buenos Aires – 30 Años
Susana Rinaldi and Leopoldo Federico – Vos y YoBest Flamenco AlbumNiña Pastori – La Orilla de mi PeloJosemi Carmona – Las Pequeñas Cosas
Chano Domínguez – Piano Ibérico
Ojos de Brujo – 10 Años – Corriente Vital
Pastora Soler – 15 Años

JazzBest Latin Jazz AlbumPaquito D'Rivera – Panamericana SuitePaquito D'Rivera and Pepe Rivero – Clazz: Continental Latin Jazz. Live At Barcelona, Teatre Paral.lel 2011
Bobby Sanabria conducting The Manhattan School of Music Afro-Cuban Jazz Orchestra – Tito Puente Masterworks Live!!!
Chucho Valdés – New York Is Now! / Viva El Sonido Cubano
Dave Valentin – Pure Imagination

ChristianBest Christian Album (Spanish Language)Tercer Cielo – Viaje a las estrellasAlex Campos – Lenguaje De Amor
Moisés Angulo – Alégrense!
Marco Barrientos – Transformados
Funky – Reset
Ingrid Rosario – Cuan Gran Amor
Davi Wornel  – Amor Y Nada mas Best Christian Album (Portuguese Language)Aline Barros – Extraordinário Amor De DeusMinistério Adoração e Vida – Em Santidade
Rosa de Saron – Horizonte Vivo Distante
Various Artists – Uma História Em Canções
Pe. Zezinho, scj – Quando Deus Se Calou

BrazilianBest Brazilian Contemporary Pop AlbumJota Quest – QuinzeArnaldo Antunes – Ao Vivo Lá em Casa
Vanessa da Mata – Bicicletas, Bolos e Outras Alegrias
Os Paralamas do Sucesso – Multishow ao Vivo Paralamas Brasil Afora
Ivete Sangalo – Multishow ao Vivo: Ivete Sangalo no Madison Square Garden
Seu Jorge e Almaz – Seu Jorge e AlmazBest Brazilian Rock AlbumCaetano Veloso – Zii e Zie – Ao VivoFresno – Revanche
Os Mutantes – Haih Or Amortecedor
Pitty – A Trupe Delirante no Circo Voador
Plebe Rude – Rachando Concreto ao Vivo em BrasíliaBest Samba/Pagode AlbumExaltasamba – Exaltasamba 25 Anos – Ao VivoMartinho da Vila – Filosofia de Vida
Fundo de Quintal – Nossa Verdade
Diogo Nogueira – Sou Eu – Ao Vivo
Zeca Pagodinho – Vida da Minha VidaBest MPB AlbumDjavan – ÁriaMilton Nascimento – E a Gente Sonhando
Mônica Salmaso – Alma Lírica Brasileira
Caetano Veloso and Maria Gadú – Multishow ao Vivo Caetano e Maria Gadú
Yeahwon – YeahwonBest Sertaneja Music AlbumJoão Bosco & Vinícius – João Bosco & ViníciusPaula Fernandes – Ao Vivo
Leonardo – Alucinação
Roberta Miranda – Sorrir Faz a Vida Valer
Michel Teló – Ao VivoBest Native Brazilian Roots AlbumNaná Vasconcelos – Sinfonia & BatuquesGeraldo Azevedo – Salve São Francisco
Gilberto Gil – Fé na Festa ao Vivo
Paulo César Pinheiro – Capoeira de Besouro
Elba Ramalho – Marco Zero ao VivoBest Brazilian SongNando Reis and Samuel Rosa – "De Repente" (Skank)Gigi, Dan Kambaiah, Fabinho O'Brian and Magno Sant'Anna – "Acelera Aê (Noite do Bem)" (Ivete Sangalo)
 Ná Ozzetti and Luiz Tatit – "Equilíbrio" (Ná Ozzetti)
Adriana Calcanhotto – "Mais Perfumado"
Eliane Elias – "What About the Heart (Bate Bate)"

Children'sBest Latin Children's AlbumPato Fu – Música de BrinquedoClaraluna – Un Mundo de Navidad
Piero – Sinfonia Inconclusa En 'L'a Mar
Omara Portuondo – Reír y Cantar
Jessyca Sarango – Henry El Camioncito Verde
Topa & Muni – La Casa de Playhouse Disney
Various Artists – Cantando Aprendo A Hablar: Vamos A Jugar

ClassicalBest Classical AlbumBrazilian Guitar Quartet – Brazilian Guitar Quartet Plays Villa-LobosAdonis González – Adios A Cuba
Clara Sverner – Chopin
Francis Hime, Nelson Ayres, OSESP, Fabio Zanon – Concertino Para Percussão" & "Concerto Para Violão
José Serebrier – José Serebrier: Sinfonia No. 1
Manuel Barrueco – Tárrega!
Villa-Lobos Trio – Villa-Lobos Trio Play: Heitor Villa-Lobos, Astor Piazzolla & Lucio Bruno-VidelaBest Classical Contemporary CompositionPaquito D'Rivera – "Panamericana Suite" (Paquito D'Rivera)Javier Álvarez – "Le Repas Du Serpent" (Iracema de Andrade)
Orlando Jacinto García – "Mixtura" (Iracema de Andrade)
Lalo Schifrin – "Romerías" (Sergio Puccini)
Sergio Roberto de Oliveira – "Umas Coisas do Coração (i- Agitado)" (Armildo Uzeda)

Recording PackageBest Recording PackageJavier Mariscal – Chico & Rita (Various Artists)Alejandro Ros – Solo Un Momento (Vicentico)Natalia Ayala, Carlos Dussan Gomez and Juliana Jaramillo – El Corazón y El Sombrero (Marta Gómez)
Juan Gatti – El Paso Trascendental del Vodevil a la Astracanada (Fangoria)
Allan Castañeda and Sandra Masías – Fiesta Inkaterra (Miki González)

ProductionBest Engineered AlbumBenny Faccone, Thom Russo and Tom Baker – Drama y Luz (Maná)Rafo Arbulú, Carlos Castro, Humberto Gatica, Guillermo 'Memo' Gil, Allan Leschhorn, Cristian Robles, Andrés Saavedra, Rodolfo Vázquez and Bernie Grundman – Días Nuevos (Gian Marco)
Valter Costa, Beto Neves, Flávio Sena, Alê Siqueira, Flávio Souza, William Jr and Carlos Freitas – Diminuto (Carlinhos Brown)
Ricky Campanelli and Juan Cristóbal Losada – Homenaje a Los Rumberos (Edwin Bonilla)
Moogie Canazio, Brad Haenel and Ron Mc Master – Manuscrito (Claudia Brant)Producer of the YearRafael Arcaute and Calle 13Aureo Baqueiro
Desmond Child
Isidro Infante
Gustavo Santaolalla

Music VideoBest Short Form Music VideoCalle 13 – "Calma Pueblo"Alexander Acha – "Amiga"
Franco De Vita featuring Alejandra Guzmán – "Tan Sólo Tú"
Maná – "Lluvia al Corazón"
Ricky Martin – "Lo Mejor de Mi Vida Eres Tú"
Shakira – "Loca"Best Long Form Music VideoFranco De Vita – En Primera Fila''Huáscar Barradas – Entre Amigos 2 En Vivo
Rubén Blades and Seis del Solar – Todos Vuelven Live DVD Vol. 1 & Vol. 2
Maná – Drama y Luz
Alejandro Sanz – Canciones Para Un Paraíso: En Vivo
Zoé – MTV Unplugged/Música de Fondo

Special AwardsLifetime Achievement AwardJoe Arroyo
Gal Costa
José Feliciano
Alex Lora
Les Luthiers
Rubén Rada
Linda RonstadtTrustees AwardManuel Alejandro
Jesús "Chucho" Ferrer
Ray SantosPerson of the Year'''
Shakira

Performers
01. Intro — "Latin Grammy 2011" 00:45
02. Calle 13, Gustavo Dudamel and Orquesta Sinfónica Simón Bolívar — "Latinoamérica " 06:30
03. Shakira — "Antes De Las Seis" 02:50
04. Los Tigres Del Norte featuring Paulina Rubio — "Golpes En El Corazón" 03:40
05. Maná featuring Prince Royce — "Lluvia al Corazón / El Verdadero Amor Perdona" 06:08
06. Franco De Vita featuring Alejandra Guzmán — "Tan Sólo Tú" 03:41
07. Wisin & Yandel and Sean Kingston — "Estoy Enamorado / Fever" 05:16
08. Marco Antonio Solís — "A Dónde Vamos a Parar" 03:36
09. Shakira — "Devoción / Loca" 05:53
10. Paula Fernandes and Romeo — "Meu Eu Em Você" 02:23
11. Pablo Alborán featuring Demi Lovato — "Solamente Tú" 02:34
12. Sie7e featuring Taboo — "Tengo Tu Love" 02:41
13. Cristian Castro — "El Triste" 03:30
14. Pepe Aguilar — "Canción mexicana" 03:03
15. Pitbull featuring Marc Anthony — "Vida 23 / Rain Over Me" 03:49
16. Romeo featuring Usher — "Promise" 04:19
17. Alex, Jorge y Lena — "La Canción Del Pescado"
18. Intocable — "Prometí"
19. Reyli and Pepe Aguilar — "Al Fín Me Arme De Valor"

Presenters
Lucero, Zoe Saldana and Sofía Vergara – introduced the show
Angelique Boyer – presented Best Regional Song
Saúl Hernández and Blanca Soto – presented Best New Artist
Chiquinquira Delgado and Juan Manuel Marquez – presented Best Urban Music Album
Banda Los Recoditos and Natalia Jiménez – presented Best Contemporary Tropical Album
Sandra Echeverría and Erik Estrada – presented Best Pop Album by a Duo/Group with Vocals
Sofía Vergara – presented Person of the Year
Héctor Acosta and Myriam Hernández – presented Best Urban Song
Adrienne Bailon and Tito El Bambino – presented Best Rock Album
Zoe Saldana – presented Record of the Year
Denisse Guerrero and Prince Royce – presented Best Male Pop Vocal Album
Silvia Navarro – presented Best Norteño Album
David Zepeda – presented Song of the Year
Lucero and Kermit the Frog – introduced Intocable
Sebastián Rulli – presented Best Female Pop Vocal Album
Paulina Rubio and Gustavo Dudamel – presented Album of the Year

References

External links
Latin Academy of Recording Arts & Sciences

2011 music awards
Latin Grammy Awards by year
2011 in Nevada
2011 in Latin music
Annual Latin Grammy Awards